The Sakonnet River is a tidal strait in the state of Rhode Island which flows approximately 14 miles between Mount Hope Bay and Rhode Island Sound. It separates Aquidneck Island from the eastern portion of Newport County.

Crossings
Below is a list of all crossings over the Sakonnet River. The list begins at the headwaters and goes downstream.

 Sakonnet River rail bridge (formerly Old Colony and Newport Railway), removed.
 Old Sakonnet River Bridge (RI 24/138)
 Replacement Sakonnet River Bridge; opened September 2012.
 Stone Bridge (formerly RI 138, destroyed by Hurricane Carol in 1954)

Tributaries
 Quaket River
 Sapowet Creek
 Almy Brook
 Little Creek

See also
 List of rivers in Rhode Island
 Narragansett Bay
 Quaket River

References
 Maps from the United States Geological Survey

Rivers of Newport County, Rhode Island
Rivers of Rhode Island
Straits of Rhode Island
Narragansett Bay